Susan Elizabeth Moxley  was Anglican Bishop of Nova Scotia and Prince Edward Island, Canada. from 2007 to 2014.

Educated at the University of Western Ontario, she rose to become a professor at Dalhousie University. Ordained in 1985, she served at Hatchet Lake (Halifax), Terence Bay and St. Mark's, Halifax. Elected suffragan bishop of Nova Scotia and PEI, in 2003 she became its diocesan in 2007. The Reverend Dr. Moxley graduated from the University of Western Ontario (BA MA) and the University of Michigan (MA Ph.D.) Atlantic School of Theology (M.Div.).

References

University of Western Ontario alumni
Academic staff of the Dalhousie University
Anglican bishops of Nova Scotia and Prince Edward Island
21st-century Anglican Church of Canada bishops
University of Michigan alumni
Living people
Women Anglican bishops
Year of birth missing (living people)